By-elections to the 15th Canadian Parliament were held to elect members of the House of Commons of Canada between the 1925 federal election and the 1926 federal election. Initially the Liberal Party of Canada and the Progressive Party of Canada formed a coalition government for the 15th Canadian Parliament, following the King–Byng Affair the Conservative Party of Canada was given a minority government, which dissolved quickly.

The list includes a Ministerial by-election which occurred due to the requirement that Members of Parliament recontest their seats upon being appointed to Cabinet. These by-elections were almost always uncontested. This requirement was abolished in 1931.

Sources
 Parliament of Canada–Elected in By-Elections

See also
List of federal by-elections in Canada

1926 elections in Canada
1925 elections in Canada
15th